Lucio Battisti is the first album by the Italian singer-songwriter Lucio Battisti. It was released in March 1969 by Dischi Ricordi.

The album
The album was Italy's third best selling album in 1969.

Track listing 
All lyrics written by Mogol; all music composed by Lucio Battisti, except where noted.
 "Un'avventura" (An Adventure) − 3:10
 "29 settembre" (29th September) − 3:30
 "La mia canzone per Maria" (My Song for Maria) − 3:10
 "Nel sole, nel vento, nel sorriso e nel pianto" (My Father Told Me) − 2:46
 "Uno in più" (One More) − 3:42
 "Non è Francesca" (She Can't Be Francesca) − 3:55
 "Balla Linda" (Dance Linda) − 3:08
 "Per una lira" (For a Lira) − 2:26
 "Prigioniero del mondo" (Prisoner of the World) (Music by Carlo Donida) − 3:28
 "Io vivrò (senza te)" (I Will Live (Without You)) − 3:54
 "Nel cuore, nell'anima" (In the Heart, in the Soul) − 2:20
 "Il vento" (The Wind) − 3:29

References

1969 debut albums
Lucio Battisti albums
Italian-language albums